Willesden railway station was a station about  north of Acton Lane level crossing in Harlesden, Middlesex, opened in 1841 by the London and Birmingham Railway (L&BR) on what became the West Coast Main Line (WCML). On 15 June 1912 the LNWR opened a new station, known as Harlesden, near the site.

References

Disused railway stations in the London Borough of Brent
Railway stations in Great Britain opened in 1841
Railway stations in Great Britain closed in 1841
Railway stations in Great Britain opened in 1844
Railway stations in Great Britain closed in 1866
Former London and Birmingham Railway stations